James Hutchinson Ware (October 27, 1941 – April 26, 2016) was a biostatistician and the Frederick Mosteller Professor of Biostatistics and Associate Dean for Clinical and Translational Science at the Harvard T.H. Chan School of Public Health.  He had been Academic Dean for 19 years (1990-2009) under Deans Harvey Fineberg and Barry Bloom and served as Acting Dean from 1997 to 1998, as Harvey Fineberg assumed the position of Provost of Harvard University. During Ware's 19-year tenure as academic dean (1990-2009), the student the School's student body doubled in size and its research budget grew at an annual rate of eight percent.  Ware was a co-investigator in the landmark Six Cities Study of Air Pollution and Health, which has had a profound effect on Clean Air Act regulations in the U.S. and efforts to limit air pollution around the world.

Education
 Yale University, New Haven, Connecticut B.A. 1963 Mathematics
 Stanford University, Stanford, California M.S. 1965 Statistics
 Stanford University, Stanford, California Ph.D. 1969 Statistics  
"Dissertation: Regression when Both Variables are Subject to Error and the Ranks of Their Means are Known."  Advisor: Bradley Efron

Career
James Ware joined the Harvard School of Public Health faculty in 1979 after receiving his PhD in statistics from Stanford University and spending eight years as mathematical statistician at the National Heart, Lung, and Blood Institute. As Dean, he was involved with a number of controversial issues.

The annual James H. Ware Award is given to a graduating student or student team "from any department and program who have engaged in a practice opportunity or experience during their time at Harvard T.H. Chan School of Public Health."  There is also a James H. Ware Scholarship Fund.

He died of esophageal cancer on April 26, 2016.  Flags were flown at half mast at the Harvard Medical School and Harvard T.H. Chan School of Public Health.

Honors
 Fellow, American Statistical Association (1987)
 Member, International Statistical Institute
 Past President, E.N.A.R. (Eastern North America Region), International Biometric Society

Publications
 Madder RD, Husaini M, Davis AT, VanOosterhout S, Khan M, Wohns D, McNamara RF, Wolschleger K, Gribar J, Collins JS, Jacoby M, Decker JM, Hendricks M, Sum ST, Madden S, Ware JH, Muller JE. Large lipid-rich coronary plaques detected by near-infrared spectroscopy at non-stented sites in the target artery identify patients likely to experience future major adverse cardiovascular events. Eur Heart J Cardiovasc Imaging. 2016 Apr; 17(4):393-9. .
 Speizer FE, Ware JH. Exploring Different Phenotypes of COPD. N Engl J Med. 2015 Jul 9; 373(2):185-6. .
 Dockery DW, Ware JH. Cleaner air, bigger lungs. N Engl J Med. 2015 Mar 5; 372(10):970-2. .
 Gleason K, Shin D, Rueschman M, Weinstock T, Wang R, Ware JH, Mittleman MA, Redline S. Challenges in recruitment to a randomized controlled study of cardiovascular disease reduction in sleep apnea: an analysis of alternative strategies. Sleep. 2014 Dec; 37(12):2035-8. ; .
 Ware JH, Vetrovec GW, Miller AB, Van Tosh A, Gaffney M, Yunis C, Arteaga C, Borer JS. Cardiovascular safety of varenicline: patient-level meta-analysis of randomized, blinded, placebo-controlled trials. Am J Ther. 2013 May-Jun; 20(3):235-46. .
 Wang R, Ware JH. Detecting moderator effects using subgroup analyses. Prev Sci. 2013 Apr; 14(2):111-20. ; .
 Martin CR, Dasilva DA, Cluette-Brown JE, Dimonda C, Hamill A, Bhutta AQ, Coronel E, Wilschanski M, Stephens AJ, Driscoll DF, Bistrian BR, Ware JH, Zaman MM, Freedman SD. Decreased postnatal docosahexaenoic and arachidonic acid blood levels in premature infants are associated with neonatal morbidities. J Pediatr. 2011 Nov; 159(5):743-749.e1-2. ; .
 Ware JH, Hamel MB. Pragmatic trials—guides to better patient care? N Engl J Med. 2011 May 5; 364(18):1685-7. .
 Verma SK, Lombardi DA, Chang WR, Courtney TK, Huang YH, Brennan MJ, Mittleman MA, Ware JH, Perry MJ. Rushing, distraction, walking on contaminated floors and risk of slipping in limited-service restaurants: a case—crossover study. Occup Environ Med. 2011 Aug; 68(8):575-81. .
 Verma SK, Chang WR, Courtney TK, Lombardi DA, Huang YH, Brennan MJ, Mittleman MA, Ware JH, Perry MJ. A prospective study of floor surface, shoes, floor cleaning and slipping in US limited-service restaurant workers. Occup Environ Med. 2011 Apr; 68(4):279-85. .
 Fitzmaurice GM, Laird NM, Ware JH, Applied Longitudinal Analysis, 2nd Edition, August 2011, .7.
 Kirtane AJ, Parise H, Mehran R, Moses JW, Fahy M, Bertrand ME, Ohman EM, White HD, Feit F, Colombo A, McLaurin BT, Cox DA, Ware JH, Pocock SJ, Lansky AJ, Stone GW. Comparison of catheterization laboratory initiated abciximab and eptifibatide during percutaneous coronary intervention in acute coronary syndromes (an ACUITY substudy). Am J Cardiol. 2010 Jul 15; 106(2):180-6. .
 Kazani S, Ware JH, Drazen JM, Taylor DR, Sears MR. The safety of long-acting beta-agonists: more evidence is needed. Respirology. 2010 Aug; 15(6):881-5; discussion 885–6. .
 Ebrahimi R, Dyke C, Mehran R, Manoukian SV, Feit F, Cox DA, Gersh BJ, Ohman EM, White HD, Moses JW, Ware JH, Lincoff AM, Stone GW. Outcomes following pre-operative clopidogrel administration in patients with acute coronary syndromes undergoing coronary artery bypass surgery: the ACUITY (Acute Catheterization and Urgent Intervention Triage strategY) trial. J Am Coll Cardiol. 2009 May 26; 53(21):1965-72. .
 LeWinn KZ, Stroud LR, Molnar BE, Ware JH, Koenen KC, Buka SL. Elevated maternal cortisol levels during pregnancy are associated with reduced childhood IQ. Int J Epidemiol. 2009 Dec; 38(6):1700-10. 
 Pocock SJ, Ware JH. Translating statistical findings into plain English. Lancet. 2009 Jun 6; 373(9679):1926-8. .
 Mehran R, Pocock SJ, Stone GW, Clayton TC, Dangas GD, Feit F, Manoukian SV, Nikolsky E, Lansky AJ, Kirtane A, White HD, Colombo A, Ware JH, Moses JW, Ohman EM. Associations of major bleeding and myocardial infarction with the incidence and timing of mortality in patients presenting with non-ST-elevation acute coronary syndromes: a risk model from the ACUITY trial. Eur Heart J. 2009 Jun; 30(12):1457-66. ; .
 Ropper AH, Gorson KC, Gooch CL, Weinberg DH, Pieczek A, Ware JH, Kershen J, Rogers A, Simovic D, Schratzberger P, Kirchmair R, Losordo D. Vascular endothelial growth factor gene transfer for diabetic polyneuropathy: a randomized, double-blinded trial. Ann Neurol. 2009 Apr; 65(4):386-93. .
 Mehta C, Gao P, Bhatt DL, Harrington RA, Skerjanec S, Ware JH. Optimizing trial design: sequential, adaptive, and enrichment strategies. Circulation. 2009 Feb 3; 119(4):597-605. .
 Lincoff AM, Steinhubl SR, Manoukian SV, Chew D, Pollack CV, Feit F, Ware JH, Bertrand ME, Ohman EM, Desmet W, Cox DA, Mehran R, Stone GW. Influence of timing of clopidogrel treatment on the efficacy and safety of bivalirudin in patients with non-ST-segment elevation acute coronary syndromes undergoing percutaneous coronary intervention: an analysis of the ACUITY (Acute Catheterization and Urgent Intervention Triage strategY) trial. JACC Cardiovasc Interv. 2008 Dec; 1(6):639-48. .
 Barrero LH, Katz JN, Perry MJ, Krishnan R, Ware JH, Dennerlein JT. Work pattern causes bias in self-reported activity duration: a randomised study of mechanisms and implications for exposure assessment and epidemiology. Occup Environ Med. 2009 Jan; 66(1):38-44. ; .
 Drazen JM, D'Agostino RB, Ware JH, Morrissey S, Curfman GD. Ezetimibe and cancer—an uncertain association. N Engl J Med. 2008 Sep 25; 359(13):1398-9. .
 Krieger N, Chen JT, Ware JH, Kaddour A. Race/ethnicity and breast cancer estrogen receptor status: impact of class, missing data, and modeling assumptions. Cancer Causes Control. 2008 Dec; 19(10):1305-18. ; .
 White HD, Chew DP, Hoekstra JW, Miller CD, Pollack CV, Feit F, Lincoff AM, Bertrand M, Pocock S, Ware J, Ohman EM, Mehran R, Stone GW. Safety and efficacy of switching from either unfractionated heparin or enoxaparin to bivalirudin in patients with non-ST-segment elevation acute coronary syndromes managed with an invasive strategy: results from the ACUITY (Acute Catheterization and Urgent Intervention Triage strategY) trial. J Am Coll Cardiol. 2008 May 6; 51(18):1734-41. .
 Gao P, Ware JH. Assessing non-inferiority: a combination approach. Stat Med. 2008 Feb 10; 27(3):392-406. .
 Ware JH, Cai T. Comments on 'Evaluating the added predictive ability of a new marker: From area under the ROC curve to reclassification and beyond' by M. J. Pencina et al., Statistics in Medicine (DOI: 10.1002/sim.2929). Stat Med. 2008 Jan 30; 27(2):185-7. .
 Gao P, Ware JH, Mehta C. Sample size re-estimation for adaptive sequential design in clinical trials. J Biopharm Stat. 2008; 18(6):1184-96. .
 Chen A, Dietrich KN, Ware JH, Radcliffe J, Rogan WJ. IQ and blood lead from 2 to 7 years of age: are the effects in older children the residual of high blood lead concentrations in 2-year-olds? Environ Health Perspect. 2005 May; 113(5):597-601. ; .
 Glass TA, Berkman LF, Hiltunen EF, Furie K, Glymour MM, Fay ME, Ware J. The Families In Recovery From Stroke Trial (FIRST): primary study results. Psychosom. Med. 2004 Nov-Dec; 66(6):889-97. .
 Weuve J, Kang JH, Manson JE, Breteler MM, Ware JH, Grodstein F. Physical activity, including walking, and cognitive function in older women. JAMA. 2004 Sep 22; 292(12):1454-61. .
 Bartels SJ, Coakley EH, Zubritsky C, Ware JH, Miles KM, Areán PA, Chen H, Oslin DW, Llorente MD, Costantino G, Quijano L, McIntyre JS, Linkins KW, Oxman TE, Maxwell J, Levkoff SE. Improving access to geriatric mental health services: a randomized trial comparing treatment engagement with integrated versus enhanced referral care for depression, anxiety, and at-risk alcohol use. Am J Psychiatry. 2004 Aug; 161(8):1455-62. .
 Dietrich KN, Ware JH, Salganik M, Radcliffe J, Rogan WJ, Rhoads GG, Fay ME, Davoli CT, Denckla MB, Bornschein RL, Schwarz D, Dockery DW, Adubato S, Jones RL. Effect of chelation therapy on the neuropsychological and behavioral development of lead-exposed children after school entry. Pediatrics. 2004 Jul; 114(1):19-26. .

See also
 Air pollution
 Clean Air Act (United States)
 Particulate pollution

Additional
 Harvard Catalyst profile for James Hutchinson Ware, PhD
 History of the Harvard School of Public Health
 Ryan, L. A Conversation with Nan Laird
 Knox RA, A Harvard Study on Newborns Draws Fire, Boston Globe, August 7, 1989, p. 25.
 NIH biosketch for James H. Ware

References

1941 births
2016 deaths
Harvard School of Public Health faculty
Stanford University alumni
American statisticians
Biostatisticians
Air quality index
Yale College alumni
Fellows of the American Statistical Association